Aegiochus bertrandi is a species of isopod in the family Aegidae, and was first described in 2009 by Niel L. Bruce. The species epithet, bertrandi, honours the French zoologist Bertrand Richer de Forges.

References

Cymothoida
Crustaceans described in 2009
Taxa named by Niel L. Bruce